Tree of Stars is a self-released EP by the alternative rock band Failure. It was produced by the band and mixed and mastered by Ken Andrews. The EP includes four live recordings (taken from the current reunion shows) and a new song, "Come Crashing", the first studio track since the 1996 album, Fantastic Planet. "Come Crashing" would later appear as the twelfth song on their 2015 comeback studio album The Heart Is a Monster.

Background
The EP was first announced on May 10, 2014, via Facebook. On May 14, "Come Crashing" was made available for purchase on bandcamp. Physical copies of the CD are exclusive to the "Tree of Stars" North American tour, which began on May 10 (Los Angeles, CA - The Greek Theatre) and ended on June 19 (Los Angeles, CA The Mayan).

Track listing
All songs written by Ken Andrews and Greg Edwards

Tracks 1 and 2 are taken from the album Magnified – tracks 3 and 4 are from Fantastic Planet.

Personnel
Failure
 Ken Andrews – vocals, guitar, bass
 Greg Edwards – bass, guitar. keyboards
 Kellii Scott – drums

References

External links
https://www.facebook.com/Failureband
http://failureband.bandcamp.com/releases

2014 EPs
Failure (band) albums